Gustavo Hungria Neves (born May 26, 1991), better known by the stage name Hungria Hip Hop, is a Brazilian rapper, singer, songwriter and music producer. He was born in Brasília and started composing at the age of 8. He grew up in Cidade Ocidental (GO) and now lives in Lago Sul.

In 2007 he released his first song entitled Hoje Tá Embaçado. In 2009 he released his Hip HopTuning mixtape with 16 tracks.

In April 2013, he returned with his solo career and released the music video for Sai Do Meu Pé. In August released another clip O Playboy Rodou. In September, he signed a contract with businessman Eduardo Bastos, and released the clip Baú Dos Piratas with the participation of Misael.  In February 2014 released the single Cama de Casal. In April, released the song Pro Cup Alto. In September, he released his first EP with 5 songs called O Playbou Rodou and the song Insonia with the participation of the group Tribo Da Periferia.  In October, he released the single and music video. Zorro do Asfalto.

In January 2015, released a new single Meu Carona.

In July 2017, released the single Coração de Aço.

In 2018, he released the song Saudade in partnership with Claudia Leitte. Together with Bhaskar, he created the music video "Abraço Forte" which was recorded in Brasilia and Ceilandia.  He also released the single Chovendo Inimigo. In 2018 he won the 2018 Multishow Prize in the Try category.

In June 2019 he released the track "Um Pedido" with a music video that reflected some of the difficulties of his earlier life. 

In April 2020, he released the track "Made in Favela".

References

1991 births
Living people
Brazilian musicians
Brazilian rappers